Tropoxane (O-1072) is an aryloxytropane derivative drug developed by Organix Inc., which acts as a stimulant and potent dopamine and serotonin reuptake inhibitor. It is an analogue of dichloropane where the amine nitrogen has been replaced by an oxygen ether link (at the bridgehead position), demonstrating that the amine nitrogen is not required for DAT binding and reuptake inhibition.

Thia analog 

The 8-thiabicyclo(3.2.1)octanes analogs such as O-4210 have been prepared.  A representative set of analogs is listed below.

It had been hypothesized that transporter binding of the tropanes might include ionic bonding of the central tropane nitrogen. But it turned out that at this site neither ionic nor hydrogen bonding is a prerequisite for potent monoamine reuptake inhibition. Oxa- and thia-analogs of RTI-111 are potent inhibitors, and even an N-replacement by methylene holds the potency within the same magnitude. However, N-quaternisation (N-dimethyl) considerably reduces DAT affinity.

In this SAR, the focus is on seeing the effect of changing 8-NMe to S, O, or CH2. Both enantiomers, as well as the racemates are presented in several cases for comparison.

See also 
 List of cocaine analogues
 O-2172

References 

Dopamine reuptake inhibitors
Chloroarenes
Methyl esters
Oxygen heterocycles
Heterocyclic compounds with 2 rings